Plagiochila wolframii is a species of plant in the family Plagiochilaceae. It is endemic to Peru.  Its natural habitat is subtropical or tropical moist lowland forests. It is threatened by habitat loss.

References

Jungermanniales
Flora of Peru
Critically endangered plants
Taxonomy articles created by Polbot